Michael J. Warner was a member of the Wisconsin State Assembly.

Biography
Warner was born on February 15, 1843, in County Cork, Ireland. He later moved to Adams County, Wisconsin. During the American Civil War, he served with the 25th Wisconsin Volunteer Infantry Regiment of the Union Army. In 1866, Warner moved to Hale, Wisconsin. He died in 1919.

Political career
Warner was elected to the Assembly in 1890. Other positions he held include town clerk and chairman of the town board (similar to city council) of Hale. He was a Democrat.

References

Politicians from County Cork
Irish emigrants to the United States (before 1923)
People from Adams County, Wisconsin
People from Trempealeau County, Wisconsin
Members of the Wisconsin State Assembly
Mayors of places in Wisconsin
Wisconsin city council members
City and town clerks
People of Wisconsin in the American Civil War
Union Army soldiers
1843 births
1919 deaths